N.W.A. Legacy may refer to:

 The N.W.A Legacy, Vol. 1: 1988–1998
 The N.W.A Legacy, Vol. 2